The 2013 Australian Football League finals series determined the winner of the 2013 AFL season. The series ran from the 6th to 28 September and culminated in the 117th AFL/VFL Grand Final, held between Fremantle and Hawthorn, which Hawthorn won. 

The top eight teams from the home and away season qualified for the finals series. The top four teams (Hawthorn, Geelong, Fremantle and Sydney) all made the preliminary finals. Both Carlton and Port Adelaide made the semi-finals, while Collingwood and Richmond lost their respective elimination finals. 

AFL final series have been played under the current format since 2000. The higher a team finishes on the ladder, the more advantages they get. First and second get a "double chance" and a home final. Third and fourth also get a "double chance" but have to play away. Fifth to eighth play elimination finals where the loser's season is over. Fifth and sixth play their elimination finals at home.

Essendon originally finished seventh but were disqualified due to an Australian Sports Anti-Doping Authority (ASADA) investigation into their possible use of un-approved supplements during the 2012 season. This promoted Carlton to eighth and Port Adelaide to seventh.

2013 saw the first time Kardinia Park had hosted a final and only the second time a final had been hosted in Geelong, the previous occurrence being in 1897 at Corio Oval.

The finals system 

Since 2000, AFL finals series have been round under the current format. The top eight teams from the home and away season qualify for the four-round finals series. The higher a team finishes, the more advantages they receive. The advantages are: "Double chances", home games, longer recovery time between games and easier lower-ranked opposition.

Qualifying finals
The top four teams in the eight receive what is popularly known as the "double chance" when they play in round-one qualifying finals. The team that finishes first on the ladder, play the fourth placed team at the first placed team's home ground. This is referred to as the first qualifying final but it is sometimes played after the second qualifying final which is between second and third on the ladder at the second placed team's home ground. Both qualifying finals are played before the elimination finals.

Winners of qualifying finals go straight through to the preliminary finals and get a week off. The losers of the qualifying finals play the winners of the elimination finals the next round in semi-finals. All teams in the qualifying finals play their next game at home.

Elimination finals
Teams fifth to eighth on the ladder play elimination finals in the first round. Fifth plays eighth in the first elimination final at the fifth placed team's home ground and sixth and seventh play in the second elimination final at the sixth placed team's home ground.  The winners of elimination play in the semi-finals in round two. The winner of the first elimination final play the loser of the first qualifying final (first or fourth) and the winner of the second elimination final play the winner of the second qualifying final (second or third). Both elimination final winners are the away teams in the semi-final. The losers of both elimination finals are eliminated and that is the end of their season.

Semi-finals
Semi-finals are the only finals played in the second round of the finals. The first semi-final is between the loser of the first qualifying final and the winner of the first qualifying final. The game is held at the loser of the first qualifying final's home ground. The second semi-final is between the loser of the second qualifying final and the winner of the second elimination final at the second qualifying final loser's home ground. The winners of the semi-finals play the winners of the qualifying finals. The winners of the first and second qualifying finals play the winners of the first and second preliminary finals respective. The winners of both Semi-finals play as the away team. The losers of semi-finals are eliminated.

Preliminary finals
Preliminary finals are held to see which teams make the Grand Final. They are held between the winners of qualifying finals and semi-finals. The winners of the second semi-final and first preliminary final play each other as do the winners of the first semi-final and second preliminary final. The winners of the qualifying finals play at home.

Grand Final

The Grand Final is typically played at 2:30 PM on the last Saturday of September at the MCG in Melbourne, Victoria. Normally there is pre-match entertainment where notable Australian performers perform for the crowd of up to 100,000. After the game the winning team is presented with the premiership cup and the winning players are presented with medallions. Winning the AFL Grand Final is the pinnacle of Australian rules football.

Qualification

Venues

Summary of results

Round one (qualifying & elimination finals)

First qualifying final (Hawthorn vs. Sydney)

Second qualifying final (Geelong vs. Fremantle)

Second elimination final (Collingwood vs. Port Adelaide)

First elimination final (Richmond vs. Carlton)

Round two (semi-finals)

First semi-final (Sydney vs. Carlton)

Second semi-final (Geelong vs. Port Adelaide)

Round three (preliminary finals)

First preliminary final (Hawthorn vs. Geelong)

Second preliminary final (Fremantle vs. Sydney)

Round four (Grand Final)

Scheduling Issues
It was the first finals match in Geelong since 1897, and the first ever at Simonds Stadium.

Notes and references

External links 
 
 RealFooty by The Age (Melbourne) Online 
 SportsAustralia (news and views)

Finals Series, 2013